This is an archontological list of Serbian monarchs, containing monarchs of the medieval principalities, to heads of state of modern Serbia.

The Serbian monarchy dates back to the Early Middle Ages. The Serbian royal titles used include Knyaz (Prince), Grand Župan (Grand Prince), King, Tsar (Emperor) and Despot.

Early medieval Serbian states (7th century–1166)

Vlastimirović dynasty (7th century–960)

The Vlastimirović dynasty was the first royal dynasty of the Serb people. Byzantine emperor Constantine VII Porphyrogenitus (r. 913–959) mentions that the Serbian throne is inherited by the son, i.e. the first-born, though in his enumeration of Serbian monarchs, on one occasion there was a triumvirate. The Serbs established several polities by the 10th century: Serbia or Zagorje (hinterlands) which consisted of Serbia (known as "Rascia" in historiography of the High Middle Ages), and Bosnia; and Pomorje (maritime) which consisted of Dioclea, Zachlumia, Pagania, Travunia (including Kanalitai). The Serbian ruler was titled knyaz or archon by the Byzantines, "prince".

The history of the dynasty starts with the eponymous founder Vlastimir. This era is marked by the Christianization of Serbs, the many internal and external wars (Bulgars, Magyars), and the power struggle between the First Bulgarian Empire and the Byzantine Empire in which Serbia found itself in the middle. The history of this dynasty ends with the annexation of Serbia in 969.

Vojislavljević dynasty (992–1091)

With the annexation of Rascia, the previous crownland and seat of Serbia, the county around the city of Doclea emerges into a Principality, where the leaders adopt the title archon of Serbs (signifying supreme leadership among Serbs) alongside their given offices under Byzantine overlordship. The first office-holder was Peter of Diokleia, of which we only have a seal found in the 19th century. The next known is Jovan Vladimir, who became a Bulgarian vassal. Stefan Vojislav succeeds in giving the realm independence, he is the eponymous founder of the Vojislavljevići that ruled Duklja from the early 11th century up to the 1120s. The dynasty may have been a cadet branch of the preceding Vlastimirovićs.

Vukanović dynasty (1091–1166)

In the mid-11th century, Mihailo I had liberated Rascia from Byzantine rule, and appointed his son Petrislav to rule as Prince, independently. In 1083, Constantine Bodin appoints brothers Vukan and Marko, sons of Petrislav, as rulers of Rascia. In 1089, the Byzantines capture Bodin, and Vukan retains independence, founding the Vukanović dynasty. The Vukanovići quickly claim the following Serbian domains in the following decades, and by 1148, the maritime possessions are united with the inland. The Byzantine Empire at times intervened in the political scene, and at times Serbia had Hungary as its main ally. The dynasty ruled until 1165, when a dynastic branch is instated by the Byzantines.

After Desa's revolt, in 1165 the Byzantium divided the Serb lands between the four sons of Zavida: Tihomir in Raška, Stracimir in Duklja, Miroslav in Zahumlje and Travunia, and Stefan Nemanja in Toplica (in today's central Serbia). Stefan Nemanja rebelled against his eldest brother Tihomir in 1166, who fled with his brothers Stracimir and Miroslav to Byzantium to seek help. But later on, Stefan Nemanja defeated his Greek army of mercenaries in the same year near the town of Pantino on Kosovo in which poor Tihomir drowned in the River of Sitnica. Nemanja captured his other brothers and made peace with them by giving them rule in their former parts of the land to recognise him as the only ruler of Rashka or Serbia. The Nemanjić dynasty was named after Stefan Nemanja and ruled over Serbia until 1371.

Late medieval Serbian state (1166–1371)

Nemanjić dynasty (1166–1371)

The Nemanjić dynasty ruled the Serb lands between ca. 1166 up to 1371.

|}

Fall of the medieval Serbian state (1371–1459)

Magnate provinces
 

The crumbling Serbian Empire under Stefan Uroš V (called "the Weak") was to be of little resistance to the powerful Ottoman Empire. In light of conflicts and decentralization of the realm, the Ottomans defeated the Serbs at the Battle of Maritsa in 1371, making vassals of the southern governors, soon thereafter, the Emperor died. As Uroš was childless and the nobility could not agree on the rightful heir, the Empire was ruled by semi-independent provincial lords, who often were in feuds with each other. The most powerful of these, Tsar Lazar, a Duke of present-day central Serbia (which had not yet come under the Ottoman yoke), stood against the Ottomans at the Battle of Kosovo in 1389. The result was indecisive, but it resulted in the subsequent fall of Serbia.

The administration was divided in the following:

Moravian Serbia: Lazar, a nobleman and close friend of the Nemanjić, would govern modern Central Serbia. He married Milica, a descendant of Stefan Nemanja's eldest son Vukan. He held the title of Lord during the Empire, and Prince after the death of Uroš V. He had a son, Stefan, who would succeed as Prince, and in 1402 he was given the title despot (hence "Serbian Despotate").
District of Branković: Vuk Branković, the son of Ohrid deputy Branko, would govern Sjenica, Kosovo and Skopje under the suzerainty of Lazar. He had a son, Đurađ Branković, who would succeed Despot Stefan. Their province continues as part of the Serbian Despotate.
Lordship of Zeta: Balša, a nobleman and distant relative of the Nemanjić, held only one town during Dušan, and during Uroš V, he is recognized as "provincial lord" holding Zeta region. He is succeeded by Đurađ, who ruled independently and was in rivalry with Marko. Đurađ II recognizes the overlordship of Lazar in 1386. The Balšić continue ruling Lower Zeta, while in Upper Zeta, Radič Crnojević take the rule, and by 1421 Crnojević held all Zeta under the Serbian Despotate. (see List of rulers of Zeta)
Lordship of Prilep: King Vukašin, a nobleman and close friend of Uroš V, would govern most of the Macedonia region. He held the title of Lord during Dušan, and under Uroš V, he was crowned King as [subordinate] co-ruler in 1365. Vukašin ruled as "Lord of the Serbian and Greek lands, and of the western provinces." He was succeeded by Prince Marko, who became an Ottoman vassal. Their province is annexed by 1395.
Domain of the Dejanović family: Dejan, a sebastokrator and brother-in-law of Dušan, would govern eastern regions from Kumanovo to Kyustendil. His sons, despot Jovan Dragaš and lord Constantine Dragaš inherited his domain and become Ottoman vassals in 1371. Their domain was annexed in 1395.

Serbian Despotate (1427–1459; titular 1471–1537)
 

The Branković family descends from the Nemanjići and the Lazarevići via female line. The family rises to prominence during the time of disintegration of the Serbian Empire under the last Nemanjić. The original family domains were centred around Kosovo region, one of the heartlands of medieval Serbian state. Later members of the house extended their rule over all remaining independent regions of Serbia making them the last suzerain rulers of medieval Serbia. The dynasty ruled the Serbian Despotate from 1427 to 1459.

Second Serbian Empire and Duchy of Srem (1526–1532)

Habsburg-occupied Serbia

Modern Serbia (1804–1918)

Revolutionary Serbia (1804–1813)

Principality of Serbia (1815–1882)

Obrenović dynasty (1815–1842)

Karađorđević dynasty (1842–1858)

Obrenović dynasty (1858–1882)

Kingdom of Serbia (1882–1918)

Obrenović dynasty (1882–1903)

Karađorđević dynasty (1903–1918)

Notes

Kingdom of Yugoslavia (1918–1941)

Karađorđević dynasty (1918–1945)
In 1918, Serbia became part of the newly formed Kingdom of Serbs, Croats and Slovenes. Later that state changed name in the Kingdom of Yugoslavia (i.e. Kingdom of South Slavs) in 1929. During that interwar period the country was a parliamentary monarchy (except during the period of royal dictatorship 1929–1931), ruled by the Karađorđević dynasty.

After World War II and the civil war Yugoslavia became a communist state known as the Socialist Federal Republic of Yugoslavia, ruled by Josip Broz Tito and the League of Communists of Yugoslavia. After Tito's death in 1980, the federation started a process of dissolution which finished in a series of civil wars in the early 1990s. Through the 1990s, constituent republics Serbia and Montenegro comprised the Federal Republic of Yugoslavia, which was restructured in 2003 into a confederation called Serbia and Montenegro. The state union ended with Montenegro's separation following the 2006 independence referendum. Currently Serbia is a parliamentary republic. There was no referendum of restoration of parliamentary monarchy, although political organizations and certain public in favor of it, do exist.

See also
List of heads of state of Serbia, for a comprehensive list of Serbian heads of state since 1804
List of heads of state of Yugoslavia
Prime Minister of Yugoslavia
President of Serbia and Montenegro
Prime Minister of Serbia and Montenegro
List of presidents of Serbia
President of Serbia
Prime Minister of Serbia
Regalia of Serbia
Burial sites of Serbian monarchs
List of heads of the Serbian Orthodox Church
List of Serbs

References

Sources

Further reading

 
Serbia
History of Serbia by topic
History of the Serbs
Monarchs
Serbian dynasties